In mathematics, Brandt semigroups are completely 0-simple inverse semigroups. In other words, they are semigroups without proper ideals and which are also inverse semigroups. They are built in the same way as completely 0-simple semigroups:

Let G be a group and  be non-empty sets. Define a matrix  of dimension  with entries in 

Then, it can be shown that every 0-simple semigroup is of the form  with the operation .

As Brandt semigroups are also inverse semigroups, the construction is more specialized and in fact, I = J (Howie 1995). 
Thus, a Brandt semigroup has the form  with the operation .

Moreover, the matrix  is diagonal with only the identity element e of the group G in its diagonal.

Remarks
1) The idempotents have the form (i, e, i) where e is the identity of G.

2) There are equivalent ways to define the Brandt semigroup. Here is another one:

ac = bc ≠ 0 or ca = cb ≠ 0 ⇒ a = b

ab ≠ 0 and bc ≠ 0 ⇒ abc ≠ 0

If a ≠ 0 then there are unique x, y, z for which xa = a,  ay = a, za = y.

For all idempotents e and f nonzero, eSf ≠ 0

See also
 Special classes of semigroups

References

.

Semigroup theory